Jackass Aeropark  was a public-use airport located in Amargosa Valley, Nevada. It was named after Jackass Flats, Nevada, where wild jackasses once gathered to graze on the Nevada Test Site.

History 
The airfield was opened in 1949 as Lathrop Wells Airport  with an unpaved  runway. It reopened in 1964 as Jackass Aeropark with an unpaved  runway built to the west of the former airstrip. The airport was owned by the U.S. Bureau of Land Management. It was deactivated by the Federal Aviation Administration on May 18, 2004.

Facilities and aircraft 
The airport had an average of 50 aircraft operations per month: 83% transient general aviation, 17% local general aviation and <1% military aviation. A 2003 Nevada DOT airport diagram showed a  taxiway and a  apron with a hangar and 8 covered tie-downs.

References

External links 
 Aerial photo as of 1 June 1998 from USGS The National Map
 Aeronautical chart showing area of former airport from SkyVector

Defunct airports in Nevada
Buildings and structures in Nye County, Nevada
Transportation in Nye County, Nevada
1949 establishments in Nevada
2004 disestablishments in Nevada
Airports disestablished in 2004